"UKNOWHOWWEDU" is a song co-written and performed by American hip hop musician Bahamadia, issued as the second single from her debut studio album Kollage. In 1996, the song peaked at #17 on the Billboard rap chart but it fared better on the dance chart, where it peaked at #15.

"UKNOWHOWWEDU" contains samples of "The Chase, Part II" by A Tribe Called Quest and "Gucci Time" by Schoolly D. Since the song's release, it has been sampled in "Crush on You" by Lil' Kim,  "Pumpin'" by Novy vs. Eniac, "Lyrical Terrorists" by Nujabes and "Rock On" by Absolute Beginner.

Music video

The official music video for the song was directed by Brian Luvar.

Chart positions

References

External links
 
 

1994 songs
1995 singles
Bahamadia songs
Chrysalis Records singles
Music videos directed by Brian Luvar
Song recordings produced by Ski Beatz
Songs written by Bahamadia
Songs written by Ski Beatz